The Motorola V120c is a CDMA cell phone sold in 2002 by Motorola. It was mainly used with Verizon and Alltel networks, and included a number of simple features. It had an extendable antenna.

The model existed in black and in silver, but there were other plastic covers from third party manufacturers.
It was very similar to the Motorola v60, but it had only one screen and it was a candybar format phone instead of a clamshell.
A big criticism was the unreliable software that the phone had, with several bugs.

There also exists a TDMA version, called v120t. It had a fixed antenna.

It was rated number three on the list of the ten highest radiation-emitting cell phones.

V120c
Mobile phones introduced in 2002